"Patrick Swayze" is a song recorded by Swedish singer Sigrid Bernson. The song was released as a digital download in Sweden on 26 February 2018 and peaked at number 27 on the Swedish Singles Chart. It is taking part in Melodifestivalen 2018, and qualified to andra chansen from the first semi-final on 3 February 2018. It was written by Andrej Kamnik, Josefin Glenmark, Peg Parnevik, and Bernson.

Track listing

Charts

Release history

References

2018 singles
2017 songs
English-language Swedish songs
Melodifestivalen songs of 2018
Swedish pop songs
Songs about actors
Universal Music Group singles
Songs written by Peg Parnevik